Alloa Tower in Alloa, Clackmannanshire in central Scotland is an early 14th century tower house that served as the medieval residence of the Erskine family, later Earls of Mar. Retaining its original timber roof and battlements, the tower is one of the earliest, and largest, of Scottish tower houses, with immensely thick walls.  It was designated as a scheduled monument in 1960 and is now owned by the National Trust for Scotland.

History
The building is made from coursed rubble and measures  in size. The building has been extensively re-fenestrated during its history, but retains some internal medieval features.

It was originally built as part of a line of fortifications defending the north shore of the Firth of Forth. Several 19th century works, including Groome's Gazetteer, date the tower to the year 1223. Archaeological investigations from the early 1990s date the original fortified house to the early 14th century, where it had a cellar that sometimes served as a pit prison. By the mid-14th century it had been enlarged with a great hall and rose to three storeys in height, with the entrance on the first floor. In the 15th century it was further enlarged to four/five levels while retaining its first-floor access. Late in the 16th century ground-floor access was probably added.

John Erskine, 6th Earl of Mar built a very large mansion (Alloa House) in 1710 that incorporated the tower as its annexe. Mar wrote:There is something in the Old Tower, espetially if made to conforme to the new designe, which is venerable for its antiquity & makes not a bad appearance & would make one regret the being obliged to pull it down.

Mar made plans to remodel the tower's interior, but it is unclear what changes were actually made. The house burned down in 1800 and was rebuilt by George Angus in 1834–1838 for the 9th Earl. It was demolished sometime after 1868.

Royal history at Alloa
In February 1497 the gardener of Alloa brought trees to plant in the garden at Stirling Castle. Margaret Tudor met the Chancellor James Beaton at Alloa on 11 July 1524, to discuss transferring power from Regent Albany to the young James V.

Mary, Queen of Scots visited the John, Lord Erskine and his wife Annabell Murray at Alloa on 16 June 1562, and again in May 1565. Mary returned to Alloa on 28 July 1566, soon after the birth of Prince James. This visit subsequently attracted the attention of her enemies, and the details are disputed. Mary wrote from Alloa on 31 July to Annabell Murray's brother-in-law, the Laird of Abercairney, on behalf of the evicted widow of one of his tenants. George Buchanan later wrote that she came by boat from Newhaven, crewed by "notorious pirates", associates of the Earl of Bothwell including William and Edmund Blackadder. Darnley came to Alloa by land but she told him to go away. It is also said she went to Stirling in disguise dressed as an ordinary townswoman "in homely sort" and joined in a dance around the Market Cross.

In December 1592 the widower John Erskine, Earl of Mar married Marie Stewart a daughter of Esmé Stewart, 1st Duke of Lennox, and the wedding celebrations were held at Alloa. James VI of Scotland and Anne of Denmark gave the bride clothes, and there was a masque in costume in which Anne of Denmark performed, dressed in silk taffeta and "gold tock". The festivities were cut short when Sir John Carmichael and Sir George Home arrived from Edinburgh with news of the crisis caused by the discovery of the Spanish blanks.

References

External links

 National Trust for Scotland page

Houses completed in the 14th century
Towers completed in the 14th century
14th century in Scotland
Category A listed buildings in Clackmannanshire
Castles in Clackmannanshire
Listed castles in Scotland
National Trust for Scotland properties
Historic house museums in Clackmannanshire
Tower houses in Scotland
Alloa